Al-Ittihad also known as Al-Ittihad al-Lubnani (The Lebanese Union) was a Lebanese newspaper established in 2017. It was published in Arabic with both a print and online site that offered a pdf issue of the actual print issues. The original licence for Al-Ittihad was given to the journalist Zeidan Zeidan almost a hundred years earlier, but the newspaper had not been published for a long time. The present owner of the newspaper licence was Mustafa Nasser who was also the daily's editor-in-chief.

The newspaper was launched on 23 October 2017. Al-Ittihad ceased publication on 29 December 2017. On its front page, the newspaper cited a combination of financial and political reasons behind its closure.  The short-lived Al Ittihad published only 54 issues before folding.

See also
List of newspapers in Lebanon

References

2017 establishments in Lebanon
2017 disestablishments in Lebanon
Arabic-language newspapers
Defunct newspapers published in Lebanon
Newspapers established in 2017
Newspapers published in Beirut
Publications disestablished in 2017
Daily newspapers published in Lebanon